John Hsu is a Taiwanese film director.

His debut feature film Detention (2019), was based on the video game of the same name. It was nominated for twelve prizes at the 56th Golden Horse Awards and won five, including Best Adapted Screenplay, shared by Fu Kai-ling and Chien Shih-keng. Hsu also won Best New Director.

References

External links

Year of birth missing (living people)
Living people
Taiwanese film directors